Howard Johnston may refer to:

 Howard Earl Johnston (1928–2001), member of the Canadian House of Commons
 Howard W. Johnston (1913–2005), principal founder of the Free University of Berlin

See also
Howard Johnson (disambiguation)